Grudie (Grùididh in Scottish Gaelic) is a village, situated between Loch a' Chuilinn and Loch Luichart with the River Bran flowing past Grudie east to west,  in Ross-shire, Scottish Highlands and is in the Scottish council area of Highland.

The River Grudie (Abhainn Ghrùididh in Scottish Gaelic) flows into the River Bran, from the north, at Grudie. Grudie Power Station is situated at Grudie, taking water from several lochs, principally Loch Fannich through a tunnel emerging 0.5 miles from the station where a pipe network delivers it to the station. The outflow of the station flows into the River Grudie.

References

Populated places in Ross and Cromarty